The 2022 Ando Securities Open was a professional tennis tournament played on indoor hard courts. It was the fifth edition of the tournament which was part of the 2022 ITF Women's World Tennis Tour. It took place in Tokyo, Japan between 14 and 20 November 2022.

Champions

Singles

  Wang Xinyu def.  Moyuka Uchijima, 6–1, 4–6, 6–3

Doubles

  Hsieh Yu-chieh /  Jessy Rompies def.  Mai Hontama /  Junri Namigata, 6–4, 6–3

Singles main draw entrants

Seeds

 1 Rankings are as of 7 November 2022.

Other entrants
The following players received wildcards into the singles main draw:
  Kyoka Kubo
  Ayumi Morita
  Riko Sawayanagi
  Ena Shibahara

The following player received entry into the singles main draw using a protected ranking:
  Ayano Shimizu

The following players received entry from the qualifying draw:
  Hiromi Abe
  Sayaka Ishii
  Funa Kozaki
  Miho Kuramochi
  Sara Saito
  Naho Sato
  Eri Shimizu
  Risa Ushijima

References

External links
 2022 Ando Securities Open at ITFtennis.com
 Official website

2022 ITF Women's World Tennis Tour
2022 in Japanese tennis
November 2022 sports events in Japan